Ruth Jones Graves Wakefield (June 17, 1903 – January 10, 1977; maiden name: Ruth Graves) was an American chef, best known as the inventor of the Toll House Cookie, the first chocolate chip cookie. She was also a dietitian, educator, business owner, and author.

Personal life
Ruth Graves Wakefield was born on June 17, 1903 and lived until January 10, 1977. She was born to Helen Vest Jones and Fred Graves and grew up in Easton, Massachusetts. To further her education, she attended what is now the Framingham State College where she studied to become a dietician and a food lecturer. She graduated in 1924 and in 1926 married Kenneth Wakefield, a meatpacking executive. Together they had one son, Kenneth Donald Wakefield Jr.

Toll House Inn

Ruth and her husband bought a tourist lodge that they called the Tollhouse Inn. They called it this because it was located on what used to be the toll road between Boston and New Bedford. Ruth cooked for the guests using her own recipes and some of her grandmother's old recipes that were a smash hit and grew the Inn's dining room from seven tables to sixty. Her recipes were so popular that she released multiple cookbooks, the most popular being a cookbook titled Ruth Wakefield's Tried and True Recipes in 1931.

Inventing the "Toll House" Chocolate Chip Cookie 
Wakefield identified a lack of diversity in her Inn's cookie offerings. Her solution was to experiment with semi-sweet chocolate to create a new cookie flavor. The cookie was invented in 1938, and got so popular that it was featured in newspapers and the Wakefields received countless letters from people requesting the recipe and the Toll House Cookie became the most popular dessert of the time. 

A myth holds that Wakefield accidentally developed the cookie, and that she expected the chocolate chunks would melt, making chocolate cookies. That is not the case; Wakefield stated that she deliberately invented the cookie. She said, "We had been serving a thin butterscotch nut cookie with ice cream. Everybody seemed to love it, but I was trying to give them something different. So I came up with Toll House cookie." She added chopped up bits from a Nestlé semi-sweet chocolate bar into a cookie. The original recipe in Toll House Tried and True Recipes is called "Toll House Chocolate Crunch Cookies". Wakefield gave Nestle the recipe for her cookies and was paid with a lifetime supply of chocolate from the company.

Toll House Cookies and WWII 

The Toll House Cookies rose to popularity in 1940, during World War II.  Ruth's daughter who worked as a cooking assistant recalls days in the kitchen filled with packing care packages to send to the Massachusetts troops overseas. They soon began receiving letters from all over the country requesting that the packages including Toll House Cookies be sent to troops from other states.

Death
Ruth retired in 1966 and sold the Toll House, which later burned down in 1984. Ruth passed away on January 10, 1977 in Plymouth, Massachusetts at the age of 73.

References

External links

1903 births
1977 deaths
People from Plymouth County, Massachusetts
American chefs
Women inventors
People from Whitman, Massachusetts
People from Walpole, Massachusetts
Cookies
History of chocolate
20th-century American inventors
American gastronomes